Mapple Glacier is a narrow glacier  long, flowing eastward between Arkovna Ridge and Stevrek Ridge in the Aristotle Mountains of Antarctica to enter Sexaginta Prista Bay on the east side of Graham Land. The glacier was surveyed by the Falkland Islands Dependencies Survey in 1961, and was named by the UK Antarctic Place-Names Committee after Father Mapple, the whalemen's Nantucket priest in Herman Melville's Moby-Dick.

References

Glaciers of Oscar II Coast
Moby-Dick